Francis Morris was a Canadian lawyer.

Francis Morris may also refer to:

Francis Orpen Morris (1810–1893), Irish clergyman
Francis Asbury Morris (1817–1881), attorney general of the Republic of Texas
Greg Morris (Francis Gregory Morris, 1933–1996), actor

See also
Frank Morris (disambiguation)
Frances Morris (disambiguation) for female version of the name
Francis Maurice, Austrian field marshal